The Warsaw Limestone is a geologic formation in Tennessee. It preserves fossils dating back to the Carboniferous period.

See also

 List of fossiliferous stratigraphic units in Tennessee
 Paleontology in Tennessee

References
 

Carboniferous geology of Tennessee
Carboniferous southern paleotropical deposits